Christmas Tales is the fourth studio album and first Christmas album by the Belarusian-Norwegian artist Alexander Rybak, it was released on 23 November 2012 in Norway. It peaked at number 34 on the Norwegian Albums Chart.

Singles
The album's only single was the duet "Presents" with Didrik Solli-Tangen. Rybak re-released several songs on YouTube during winter season 2014.

Track listing

Chart performance

Release history

Personnel
Sourced from Grappa.

Performers and musicians
Alexander Rybak - vocals, all strings
Annsofi - vocals 
Didrik Solli-Tangen - vocals 
Knut Bjørnar Asphol - guitar, bass, percussion
Hermund Nygård – drums
Børge-Are Halvorsen – saxophone
Jens Petter Antonsen – trumpet, trombone
Pernille Hogstad Stene – backing vocals 
Staffan William-Olsson - wind instrument 
Amir Aly – guitar, bass 
Robert Engstrand – piano 
Petter Lindgård – trumpet, horn 
Jens Lindgård – trombone 
Peter Zimney – saxophone 
Barrat Dues Chamber Orchestra - , 
Anja Eline Skybakkmoen; Ane Carmen Roggen; Ida Roggen; Anine Kruse Skatrud; Leif Haugland, Hans Ole Hansen, Morten Midtlien - choir

Production
Alexander Rybak - arrangements, production , 
Knut Bjørnar Asphol - production
Amir Aly - production 
Sean Lewis - mixing , 
Torfin Thorsen - additional string arranger 
Nils Thore Røsth - additional string arranger , concert master , 
Børge-Are Halvorsen - wind instrument arrangement 
Hans Fredrik Asbjørnsen - photographs
Håkon Ims - album design
Frode Skaren - illustrations

References

Alexander Rybak albums
2012 Christmas albums